The 2020 NorthPort Batang Pier season was the eighth season of the franchise in the Philippine Basketball Association (PBA).

Draft picks

Roster

Philippine Cup

Eliminations

Standings

Game log

|-bgcolor=ffcccc
| 1
| October 12
| Blackwater
| L 89–96
| Christian Standhardinger (23)
| Sean Anthony (13)
| Anthony, Standhardinger (6)
| AUF Sports Arena & Cultural Center
| 0–1
|-bgcolor=ffcccc
| 2
| October 15
| Phoenix
| L 105–110
| Christian Standhardinger (28)
| Sean Anthony (12)
| Sean Anthony (10)
| AUF Sports Arena & Cultural Center
| 0–2
|-bgcolor=ffcccc
| 3
| October 18
| Rain or Shine
| L 68–70
| Anthony, Lanete, Standhardinger (13)
| Sean Anthony (12)
| Anthony, Manganti (3)
| AUF Sports Arena & Cultural Center
| 0–3
|-bgcolor=ffcccc
| 4
| October 21
| NLEX
| L 88–102
| Kevin Ferrer (18)
| Christian Standhardinger (13)
| Christian Standhardinger (5)
| AUF Sports Arena & Cultural Center
| 0–4
|-bgcolor=ccffcc
| 5
| October 24
| Terrafirma
| W 107–96
| Christian Standhardinger (23)
| Christian Standhardinger (12)
| Standhardinger, Subido (5)
| AUF Sports Arena & Cultural Center
| 1–4

|-bgcolor=ffcccc
| 6
| November 3
| TNT
| L 87–112
| Kelly Nabong (17)
| Christian Standhardinger (12)
| Elorde, Lanete, Manganti (3)
| AUF Sports Arena & Cultural Center
| 1–5
|-bgcolor=ffcccc
| 7
| November 4
| Ginebra
| L 100–112
| Standhardinger, Ferrer (23)
| Cruz, Standhardinger (11)
| Renzo Subido (8)
| AUF Sports Arena & Cultural Center
| 1–6
|-bgcolor=ffcccc
| 8
| November 6
| Alaska
| L 94–102
| Christian Standhardinger (39)
| Christian Standhardinger (16)
| Standhardinger, Ferrer (5)
| AUF Sports Arena & Cultural Center
| 1–7
|-bgcolor=ffcccc
| 9
| November 8
| Magnolia
| L 76–83
| Standhardinger, Ferrer (18)
| Christian Standhardinger (17)
| Renzo Subido (6)
| AUF Sports Arena & Cultural Center
| 1–8
|-bgcolor=ffcccc
| 10
| November 10
| San Miguel
| L 99–120
| Kelly Nabong (29)
| Kelly Nabong (10)
| Nico Elorde (8)
| AUF Sports Arena & Cultural Center
| 1–9
|-bgcolor=ffcccc
| 11
| November 11
| Meralco
| L 73–80
| Jervy Cruz (15)
| Jervy Cruz (17)
| Nico Elorde (4)
| AUF Sports Arena & Cultural Center
| 1–10

Transactions

Trades

Preseason

Free Agency

Addition

Subtraction

Rookie Signings

References

NorthPort Batang Pier seasons
NorthPort Batang Pier